Mr. Stripey (sometimes confused with Tigerella) is a type of heirloom tomato with unusually small leaves and a mix of a yellow and red color that can fool some growers into thinking they are picking an unripe tomato. Under good conditions in size, shape and internal structure it may be considered a "beefsteak". Tigerella is generally smaller than the Mr Stripey variety and the colors are less defined, they actually are two distinct different heirloom varieties. Tigerella isn't as sweet or "low-acid" as the Mr. Stripey variety, either.  Like other heirlooms, Mr. Stripey has an appearance that differs considerably from other tomatoes.  In coloration, it is mostly somewhat more yellow near the stem and more red towards its underside, with gentle stripes of red and yellow blending into each other along the sides.  This coloration may extend into the interior of the fruit, which tends to be more yellow than red.

When conditions are right and the fruit is fully ripe, the taste will be surprisingly sweet and mild, superior to most store bought varieties.  The mild character of the tomato flavor is best used where it is intended to blend in with other flavors, such as in a pasta sauce or salad.  The flavor in good conditions and when fully ripe is pleasingly sweet when sliced raw — excellent for hors d'oeuvres.  The ripe flesh is soft, juicy, and extremely tender.

See also

 List of tomato cultivars
 List of heirloom tomato cultivars

External links
 Picture Gallery from Google Images

Heirloom tomato cultivars